Emad Afroogh (born 1956) is an Iranian sociologist and conservative politician. He studied at Shiraz University and Tarbiat Modares University. He was a member of the Iranian parliament (2004–2008).

Views
Afroogh has been described as having staunch Anti-globalization and Anti-capitalism views.

References

External links
 Official website (in Persian)

1956 births
Living people
Iranian academics
Coalition of Iran's Independent Volunteers politicians
Deputies of Tehran, Rey, Shemiranat and Eslamshahr
Shiraz University alumni
Tarbiat Modares University alumni
Members of the 7th Islamic Consultative Assembly
Alliance of Builders of Islamic Iran politicians
Anti-globalization activists